Edakkad Battalion 06 is an Indian Malayalam-language action  drama film directed by Swapnesh K. Nair, written by P.Balachandran, and produced by Shrikant Bhasi, Tomas Joseph Pattathanam and Jayant Mammen under the banner of Ruby Films. Starring an ensemble cast of Tovino Thomas, Samyuktha Menon, Rekha, Joy Mathew, Sudheesh and Abu Salim, the film is inspired by a true story. The filming began in May 2019.

The film was released on 18 October 2019.

Synopsis
Shafeek's father wanted him to become a chef, but he chose to serve his country ,India ,instead. On his annual leave from work, Shafeek, now a young soldier, must deal with his family, his bride to be and a gang involved in illegal activities .

Cast

 Tovino Thomas as Captain Shafeeq Muhammad
 Samyuktha as Naina Fathima
 Shalu Rahim as Ashokan, Dineshan's Son
 Jitin Puthanchery as Prince
 Karthik Vishnu as Roopesh
 Shankar Induchoodan as Nanku
 P Balachandran as Muhammad Kutti
 Rekha as Surayya Muhammed Kutti (Member)
 Santhosh Keezhattoor as Ummer, Shafeek's Brother in Law
 Divya Pillai as Sameera, Shafeek's Sister
 Sarasa Balussery as Thithummachi, Shafeek's Father's Sister
 Joy Mathew as Basheer, Naina Fathima Father
 Uma Nair as Seenath Basheer, Naina Fathima Mother
 Nirmal Palazhi as Shankaran
 Anjali Nair as Shankaran's Sister
 Ponnamma Babu as Shankaran's Mother
 Malavika Menon as Shalini, Shankaran's Sister
 Salim Kumar as Santhosh, School NCC Master
 Sudheesh as Police Constable Dineshan
 Dheeraj Denny  
 Sibi K Thomas
 Jithin Premnath
 Jeo Baby as Villager 
 Abu Salim
 Saiju Kurup
 Sasi Kalinga

Soundtrack

The soundtrack composed by Kailas Menon with lyrics written by B K Harinarayanan. For "Shehnai Song" the lyrics are by Manu Manjith.

Release
The film was released on 18 October 2019.

Reception
The Times of India rated the film 2.5 out of 5 and wrote, "Edakkad Battalion 06 comes as a widely stretched out tribute to the brave martyrs of the land. The gravity and effect of martyrdom plays out in the last 10 minutes of the movie, which is by far the only part that manages to incite an emotion." Sify gave 2.5    and wrote, "With an average script, the story meanders along without a definite direction for most parts here. Perhaps the whole effort was to take it to the climax where there is a wafer thin plot."

The New Indian Express gave 2 out of 5 and wrote, "barring two notably tense moments in the first half—a daring rescue operation (involving fire) and a fight scene (involving water)—Edakkad Battalion fails to make us feel anything in other segments."

References

External links

2019 films
2010s Malayalam-language films
2019 action drama films
Indian action drama films
Films shot in Kozhikode
Indian Army in films
Films scored by Kailas Menon